Leptophilypnus is a genus of small fishes in the family Eleotridae native to fresh and brackish water in Central America.

Species
The recognized species in this genus are:
 Leptophilypnus fluviatilis Meek & Hildebrand, 1916
 Leptophilypnus guatemalensis Thacker & Pezold, 2006
 Leptophilypnus panamensis (Meek & Hildebrand, 1916)

References

Eleotridae